Krstur may mean:

 Ruski Krstur, a village in Vojvodina, Serbia
 Srpski Krstur, a village in Vojvodina, Serbia